Pyrophorus punctatissimus is a species of click beetle (family Elateridae).

Description
The basic coloration is  dark brown. The antennae are serrate. The pronotum shows a long backward-pointing tooth.

These beetles are bioluminescent by means of  two light organs at the posterior corners of the prothorax, and a broad area on the dorsal region of the abdomen, hidden by the wings and seen when flying. Their bioluminescence is similar to that of another group of beetles, the fireflies, although click beetles do not flash, but remain constantly glowing. Also the larvae and the pupae have light organs.

Distribution
This species can be found in Bolivia, Argentina, Brazil, Paraguay, Uruguay and Cuba.

References
  Elateridae in SYNOPSIS OF THE DESCRIBED COLEOPTERA OF THE WORLD
 Universal Biological Indexer

External links
 Pybio.org
 Beetles of Argentina

Elateridae
Bioluminescent insects
Beetles described in 1843